Buddhism has a long history in Indonesia, and is recognized as one of the six recognized religions in Indonesia, along with Islam, Christianity (Protestantism and Catholicism), Hinduism and Confucianism. According to the 2018 national census roughly 0.8% of the total citizens of Indonesia were Buddhists, and numbered around 2 million. Most Buddhists are concentrated in Jakarta, Riau, Riau Islands, Bangka Belitung, North Sumatra, and West Kalimantan. These totals, however, are probably inflated, as practitioners of Taoism and Chinese folk religion, which are not considered official religions of Indonesia, likely declared themselves as Buddhists on the most recent census. Today, the majority of Buddhists in Indonesia are Chinese, however small communities of native Buddhists (such as Javanese and Sasak) also exist.

History

Antiquity 
Buddhism is the second oldest religion in Indonesia after Hinduism, which arrived from India around the second century. The history of Buddhism in Indonesia is closely related to the history of Hinduism, as a number of empires influenced by Indian culture were established around the same period. The arrival of Buddhism in the Indonesian archipelago began with trading activity, from the early 1st century, by way of the maritime Silk Road between Indonesia and India. The oldest Buddhist archaeological site in Indonesia is arguably the Batujaya stupas complex in Karawang, West Java. The oldest relic in Batujaya was estimated to originate from the 2nd century, while the latest dated from the 12th century. Subsequently, significant numbers of Buddhist sites were found in Jambi, Palembang, and Riau provinces in Sumatra, as well as in Central and East Java. The Indonesian archipelago has, over the centuries, witnessed the rise and fall of powerful Buddhist empires, such as the Sailendra dynasty, the Mataram, and Srivijaya empires.

According to some Chinese source, a Chinese Buddhist monk I-tsing on his pilgrim journey to India, witnessed the powerful maritime empire of Srivijaya based on Sumatra in the 7th century. The empire served as a Buddhist learning center in the region.  A notable Srivijayan revered Buddhist scholar is Dharmakīrtiśrī, a Srivijayan prince of the Sailendra dynasty, born around the turn of the 7th century in Sumatra. He became a revered scholar-monk in Srivijaya and moved to India to become a teacher at the famed Nalanda University, as well as a poet. He built on and reinterpreted the work of Dignaga, the pioneer of Buddhist Logic, and was very influential among Brahman logicians as well as Buddhists. His theories became normative in Tibet and are studied to this day as a part of the basic monastic curriculum. Other Buddhist monks that visited Indonesia were Atisha, Dharmapala, a professor of Nalanda, and the South Indian Buddhist Vajrabodhi. Srivijaya was the largest Buddhist empire ever formed in Indonesian history. Indian empires such as the Pala empire helped fund Buddhism in Indonesia, specifically funding a monetary for Sumatran monks.

A number of Buddhist historical heritages can be found in Indonesia, including the 8th century Borobudur mandala monument and Sewu temple in Central Java, Batujaya in West Java, Muaro Jambi, Muara Takus and Bahal temple in Sumatra, and numerous of statues or inscriptions from the earlier history of Indonesian Hindu-Buddhist kingdoms. During the era of Kediri, Singhasari and Majapahit empire, Buddhism — identified as Dharma ri Kasogatan — was acknowledged as one of kingdom's official religions along with Hinduism. Although some of kings may have favored Hinduism, harmony, toleration, and even syncretism were promoted as manifested in Bhinneka Tunggal Ika national motto, coined from Kakawin Sutasoma, written by Mpu Tantular to promotes tolerance between Hindus (Shivaites) and Buddhists. The classical era of ancient Java also had produces some of the exquisite examples of Buddhist arts, such as the statue of Prajnaparamita and the statue of Buddha Vairochana and Boddhisttva Padmapani and Vajrapani in Mendut temple.

Decline and revival
In the 13th century Islam entered the archipelago, and began gaining foothold in coastal port towns. The fall of Hindu-Buddhist Majapahit empire in late 15th century marked the end of Dharmic civilization in Indonesia. By the end of the 16th century, Islam had supplanted Hinduism and Buddhism as the dominant religion of Java and Sumatra. For 450 years after that there was no significant Buddhist practice in Indonesia. Many Buddhist sites, stupas, temples, and manuscripts were lost or forgotten as the region became predominantly Muslim. During this era of decline few people practiced Buddhism, most of them are Chinese immigrants who settled in Indonesia when migration accelerated in the 17th century. Many of klenteng (Chinese temples) in Indonesia are in fact a tridharma temple that houses three faiths, namely Buddhism, Confucianism and Taoism.

In 1934, Narada Thera, a missionary monk from Sri Lanka, visited the Dutch East Indies for the first time as part of his journey to spread the Dharma in Southeast Asia. This opportunity was seized by local Buddhists to revive Buddhism in Indonesia. A Bodhi tree planting ceremony was held on the Southeastern side of Borobudur on March 10, 1934, under the blessing of Narada Thera, and some Upasakas were ordained as monks.

Modern Indonesia 

Following the downfall of President Sukarno in the mid-1960s, Pancasila was reasserted as the official Indonesian policy on religion to only recognise monotheism. As a result, founder of Perbuddhi (Indonesian Buddhists Organisation), Bhikku Ashin Jinarakkhita, proposed that there was a single supreme deity, Sanghyang Adi Buddha. He was also backed up with the history behind the Indonesian version of Buddhism in ancient Javanese texts, and the shape of the Borobudur Temple.

During the New Order era, Pancasila listed Buddhism among the five official religions of Indonesia.  The national leader of the time, Suharto, had considered Buddhism and Hinduism as Indonesian classical religions.

The first Theravada ordination of bhikkhunis in Indonesia after more than a thousand years occurred in 2015 at Wisma Kusalayani in Lembang, Bandung, West Java

Today, in reference to the principle of Pancasila, a Buddhist monk representing the Buddhist Sangha, along with priest, Brahmin, clergy or representative of other recognized religions, would participate in nearly all state-sponsored ceremonies. The ceremony would always include a prayer (led by a Muslim imam with representatives of other faiths standing in a row behind him). Although the majority of Indonesian Buddhists are of the Chinese Mahayana school, more often than not the representative of Buddhism as selected by the Government would happen to be a Theravada monk.

Once a year thousands of Buddhists from Indonesia and neighboring countries flock to Borobudur to commemorate national Waisak Day.

Literature 
The oldest extant esoteric Buddhist Mantranaya (largely a synonym of Mantrayana, Vajrayana and Buddhist Tantra) literature in Old Javanese, a language significantly influenced by Sanskrit, is enshrined in the Sang Kyang Kamahayanan Mantranaya.

The Lalitavistara Sutra was known to the Mantranaya stonemasons of Borobudur, refer: The birth of Buddha (Lalitavistara). 'Mantranaya' is not a corruption or misspelling of 'mantrayana' even though it is largely synonymous. Mantranaya is the term for the esoteric tradition on mantra, a particular lineage of Vajrayana and Tantra, in Indonesia. The clearly Sanskrit sounding 'Mantranaya' is evident in Old Javanese tantric literature, particularly as documented in the oldest esoteric Buddhist tantric text in Old Javanese, the Sang Kyang Kamahayanan Mantranaya  refer Kazuko Ishii (1992).

Current practice 

In Indonesia Buddhism is mainly followed by the Chinese Indonesian people and some small indigenous groups of Indonesia, with 0.8% (including Taoism and Confucianism) of Indonesia's population being Buddhists. Most of Chinese Indonesians are inhabiting urban areas, thus Indonesian Buddhist also mostly living in urban areas. Top ten Indonesian provinces with significant Buddhist populations are; Jakarta, North Sumatra, West Kalimantan, Banten, Riau, Riau Islands, West Java, East Java, South Sumatra, and Central Java.

A small minority of Sasaks called the "Bodha" are mainly found in the village of Bentek and on the slopes of Gunung Rinjani, Lombok. They had managed to avoid any Islamic influence and worship deities like Dewi Sri with Esoteric Buddhist and Hindu influences in their rituals due to their secluded geographical location. This group of Sasak, due in part to the name of their tribe, are recognized as Buddhists by the Indonesian government. At present, there are more than 10,000 Buddhists in their community and belonging to the Theravadin tradition. 

Pockets of Javanese Buddhists also exist and are to be found mainly in villages and cities in Central and East Java. The regencies of Temanggung, Blitar and Jepara count about 30.000 Buddhists, mostly of Javanese ethnicity. For example, native Javanese Buddhists population formed as the majority in mountainous villages of Kaloran subdistrict in Temanggung Regency, Central Java.

Official Census (2018)
According to the 2018 census, there were a total 2,062,150 of  Buddhism in Indonesia. The percentages of Buddhism in Indonesia increased from 0.7% in 2010 to 0.77% in 2018.

Schools 
Today there are numerous Buddhist schools established in Indonesia. The earliest school that was established in Indonesia was Vajrayana Buddhism, which developed from Mahayana Buddhism, and which had some similarities with later Tibetan Buddhism. Various temples of ancient Java and Sumatra are Vajrayana. Chinese Buddhism (the main branch of Mahayana Buddhism) has gained followers from Chinese Indonesian populations that began to migrate into the archipelago during the 17th to 18th century. Other notable schools are Theravada Buddhism from Sri Lanka and Thailand.

Indonesia's most notable Buddhist organization is Perwakilan Umat Buddha Indonesia (Walubi) which serves as the vehicle of all Buddhist schools in Indonesia. Other Buddhist organizations include Majelis Buddhayana Indonesia, Sangha Agung Indonesia (SAGIN), Sangha Theravada Indonesia (STI), Sangha Mahayana Indonesia, and the Taiwan-originated Tzu-Chi.

Religious events 

The most important Buddhist religious event in Indonesia is Vesak. Once a year, during the full moon in May or June, Buddhists in Indonesia observe Vesak day commemorating the birth, death, and the time when Siddhārtha Gautama attained the highest wisdom to become the Buddha Shakyamuni. Vesak is an official national holiday in Indonesia and the ceremony is centered at the three Buddhist temples by walking from Mendut to Pawon and ending at Borobudur.
Vesak also is often celebrated in Sewu temple and numerous Buddhist temples in Indonesia.

Discrimination & Protests 
The Chinese Indonesian community in Tanjung Balai municipality in North Sumatra has protested against the administration's plan to dismantle a statue of Buddha on top of the Tri Ratna Temple.

On July 29, 2016, several Buddhist vihara were plundered and burnt down in Tanjung Balai of North Sumatra. On 26 November 2016, a homemade bomb was discovered in front of Vihara Buddha Tirta, a Buddhist temple in Lhok Seumawe of Aceh.

See also
Waisak Day
Ashin Jinarakkhita
Narada Maha Thera
Parwati Soepangat
Metta Sutta
Mangala Sutta
Lumbini Natural Park
Vihara Buddhagaya Watugong
Borobodur
Dharmakīrtiśrī
Bianhong
Lalitavistara Sūtra
Candi of Indonesia
Sanghyang Adi Buddha
Indonesian Esoteric Buddhism
A Record of Buddhist Practices Sent Home from the Southern Sea
Buddhism in Southeast Asia

Notes

Bibliography
 Kimura B. (2003).Present Situation of Indonesian Buddhism: In Memory of Bhikkhu Ashin Jinarakkhita Mahasthavira, Nagoya Studies in Indian Culture and Buddhism: Sambhasa 23, 53-72

External links

 
Indonesia